Cinnamanur Subramaniam Chellappa (29 September 1912 – 18 December 1998) was a Tamil writer, journalist and Indian independence movement activist. He belonged to the "Manikodi" literary movement along with Pudhumaipithan, Ku Pa Ra, Va. Ramasamy, N. Pichamoorthi and A. N. Sivaraman. He also founded Ezhuthu, a literary magazine His novel Suthanthira Thagam won the Sahitya Akademi Award for 2001.

Biography
Chellappa was born in Batlagundu in the year1912 to Subramanian, a government employee and nationalist. Chellappa did his schooling in Tuticorin and obtained a degree in economics. However, he failed to obtain a degree in English literature.

In the early years of his life, Chellappa was influenced by Bhagat Singh but later he adopted Mahatma Gandhi's creed of non-violence. Chellappa participated in the Batlagundu satyagraha and was arrested on 10 January 1941. He spent six months in jail and on his return, established a paper manufacturing industry. Chellappa began writing in 1934 when he published his first story Margazhi Malar.

By the time of his death in 1998, Chellappa had written over 109 short stories and 50 articles.

Partial bibliography

Novels
Vaadivasal (1958) 
Jeevanamsam
Suthanthira Thagam

Plays
Muraipenn

Literary criticism
Ramaiyyavin sirukathai kalam
Oothupathi pul
Mayathachan

References 

1912 births
1998 deaths
Tamil writers
Recipients of the Sahitya Akademi Award in Tamil
Indian male short story writers
Indian independence activists from Tamil Nadu
Indian male novelists
Indian literary critics
20th-century Indian novelists
20th-century Indian short story writers
Novelists from Tamil Nadu
20th-century Indian male writers